Jacques Dars (1941 – 28 December 2010) was a French sinologist and translator. He translated several works into French, including Water Margin (Shuihu zhuan).

In 1979 he won the Prix Langlois, Prix de l’Académie française for the Traduction de Au bord de l’eau, de Shi Naï-an et Luo Guan-Zhong.

He spoke over 20 languages. He died on 28 December 2010 in Annecy, France at age 69.

Publications
In French:
 La marine chinoise du Xe au XIVe siècle, 1992, Economica, Paris
 Comment lire un roman chinois, 2001, Picquier, Arles
 L'unique trait de pinceau, avec Fabienne Verdier et Cyrille Javary, 2001, Albin Michel
 Dars, Jacques. "Traduction terminable et interminable." (Archive) In: Alleton, Vivianne and Michael Lackner (editors). De l'un au multiple: traductions du chinois vers les langues européennes Translations from Chinese into European Languages. Éditions de la maison des sciences de l'homme (Les Editions de la MSH, FR), 1999, Paris. p. 146-159. , 9782735107681.  - English abstract available

Translations (in French):
 Li Yu (2003). Au gré d'humeurs oisives : Les carnets secrets de Li Yu : un art du bonheur en Chine. Arles : Éditions Philippe Picquier. 
 Shi Nai'an, Au bord de l'eau (Shuihu zhuan), traduit, présenté et annoté par J. Dars, préface d'Étiemble, Gallimard, Paris, 1st édition 1978 - Prix Langlois 1979 de l'Académie française
 Contes de la Montagne sereine, traduction, introduction et notes par J. Dars, 1987, Gallimard, Connaissance de l'Orient, Paris
 Aux portes de l'enfer, récits fantastiques de la Chine ancienne, trad. du chinois par J. Dars, 1997, Picquier, Arles
 Ji Yun, Passe-temps d'un été à Luanyang, traduit du chinois, présenté et annoté par J. Dars, 1998, Gallimard, Paris
 Ji Yun, Des nouvelles de l'au-delà, textes choisis, traduits du chinois et annotés par J. Dars, 2005, Gallimard, Paris
 Qu You, Le pavillon des Parfums-Réunis, et autres nouvelles chinoises des Ming, traduit du chinois par Jacques Dars, revu par Tchang Foujouei, 2007, Gallimard, folio, Paris

Notes

External links
  Pierre Kaser, "Hommage à Jacques Dars"(Archive), Association française d'études chinoises (French Association of Chinese Studies).

1937 births
2010 deaths
20th-century French historians
20th-century French translators
Chinese–French translators
French sinologists